, Roshi (April 1, 1907 – July 27, 2014) was a Japanese Rinzai Zen teacher who sought to tailor his teachings to westerners, he lived in Los Angeles, United States. Joshu Sasaki opened dozens of centres and was founder and head abbot of the Mount Baldy Zen Center, near Mount Baldy in California, and of the Rinzai-Ji order of affiliated Zen centers. He was one of the most influential Zen masters in America.

Biography
Joshu Sasaki became an ordained monk at age thirteen under his teacher, Joten Soko Miura. Soon after, he followed Joten Soko Miura to Myoshin-ji, the head temple of one of the largest branches of Rinzai. Having been awarded the title of roshi in 1947, Kyozan Joshu Sasaki took the position of an abbot at Yotoku-in. In 1953 he was appointed abbot of Shojuan.

In 1962, at the request of Daiko Furukawa, Joshu decided to travel to the United States to teach students in the West, founding a Zen center in Los Angeles.

Joshu Sasaki regularly offered formal training sessions at both the Mount Baldy Zen Center and the Bodhi Manda Zen Center, occasionally offering sesshin at the Rinzai-Ji Zen Center in Los Angeles and Haku-un-ji Zen Center in Tempe, Arizona, as well as at numerous other centers on the American East Coast, and in Europe. His teaching could be characterized as direct, challenging and uncompromising; he maintained a rigorous training and teaching schedule well into his 90's. Joshu Sasaki's public and retreat talks centred on "Tathagata Zen", and he very often used the Rinzai Roku and Blue Cliff Record as starting points for his lectures and teishos. Towards the end of his life, his teaching schedule greatly depended on his health. In early February 2012, at the age of 104,  Joshu Roshi became ill with aspiration pneumonia and did not teach at MBZC (or any affiliate Zen Center) again. On November 10, at a dedication ceremony for the Zendo remodel, Joshu Roshi officially resigned as abbot of the Mount Baldy Zen Center for health reasons.

Joshu Sasaki has given full Rinzai priest ordination to approximately 20 students, which grants them the title oshō. But Kyozan Joshu Sasaki did not give dharma transmission, which is in Rinzai the qualification needed to train students in a training hall to become a priest. Nevertheless, several of his students are recognized by their community "as wise guides of various communities". Although he had no official "dharma heirs," followers of Sasaki founded about 30 Zen centers around the world.

One of his best known students was Canadian poet and singer-songwriter Leonard Cohen, who served as personal assistant to Joshu Sasaki during his 1990s seclusion to the Mt. Baldy monastery. Many of the poems in Cohen's 2006 Book of Longing refer to Mt. Baldy and Joshu Sasaki (mostly referred to as "Roshi").

Writing under the pen name Shozan Jack Haubner, another student of Sasaki Roshi's has published partially fictionalized books and essays which refer to Sasaki Roshi's teachings and describe everyday life in Rinzai-Ji affiliated Zen centers.

In a 24 December 2009 interview Eshin Godfrey, Abbot of the Zen Centre of Vancouver and a student of Sasaki-roshi, said of his teacher,

Joshu Sasaki died at Cedars Sinai Hospital in Los Angeles on July 27, 2014, aged 107.

Controversies

Sasaki Roshi was among a generation of missionary Buddhist teachers accused of improper relations with his students. He was one of four major Zen teachers who came to the United States in the 1960s and had a major impact on the growth of Zen in America; the others teachers were Shunryu Suzuki, Eido Shimano, Taizan Maezumi. All but Suzuki were involved with widely publicized scandals involving sexual impropriety. The complex roots of such behavior in Buddhist communities both in Japan and in the United States remain under investigation. In light of these significant abuses of authority, the Buddhists in the United States have developed statements on ethics and various guidelines for prospective students to apply in choosing a teacher.

In 1997, members of his Mt. Baldy Zen Center wrote a letter alleging that Sasaki Roshi was engaging in sexual misconduct with his female students. 

Stephen Wilder, a monk who was ordained in 1977, wrote a resignation letter in 1982, also alleging sexual harassment:

A student of Joshu Roshi, Giko David Rubin, raised concerns about Roshi's sexual conduct to Joshu Roshi himself as well as his inner circle. Rubin wrote:

In 2012, Eshu Martin, a former monk in the Rinzai-ji community and student of Sasaki, also publicly accused Sasaki, who was then 105 years old, of sexual misconduct with students.

According to the New York Times, some students posted in message boards that, the Sasaki would tell them that sexual contact with a Zen master, or roshi, like him would help them attain new levels of “non-attachment,” one of Zen’s main objectives. If they resisted, he used intimidation and threats of expulsion.

A February 2013 article in the Albuquerque Journal wrote:

See also
Rinzai school
Myoshin-ji
Mount Baldy Zen Center
List of Rinzai Buddhists
Buddhism in the United States
Timeline of Zen Buddhism in the United States
Leonard Cohen

References

Sources

External links

Bodhi Manda Zen Centre
Rinzai-Ji Zen Centre
Haku-un-ji Zen Center
Zen Centre of Vancouver
Maha Bodhi Zen Center
Sasaki’s Mt. Baldy at wearesentience.com
Talks by Joshu Sasaki Roshi at sasakiroshizen.net

1907 births
2014 deaths
Zen Buddhist abbots
Japanese centenarians
Rinzai Buddhists
Japanese Zen Buddhists
Men centenarians